The Dolores River is a tributary of the Colorado River, approximately  long, in the U.S. states of Colorado and Utah. The river drains a rugged and arid region of the Colorado Plateau west of the San Juan Mountains. Its name derives from the Spanish El Rio de Nuestra Señora de Dolores, River of Our Lady of Sorrows. The river was explored and possibly named by Juan Maria Antonio Rivera during a 1765 expedition from Santa Fe.

Course

The Dolores River rises in a meadow called Tin Can Basin, near  Hermosa Peak in the San Miguel Mountains, in Dolores County, Colorado. The river flows southwest in a canyon past Rico, receiving the West Dolores River, then flows into McPhee Reservoir near Dolores in Montezuma County.

This section of the Dolores River is noted for its exposed sedimentary strata, desert wildlife, and during years of heavy snowmelt for its whitewater. Near Egnar the river crosses into San Miguel County and then from there into Montrose County.

Continuing north, the Dolores cuts across the Paradox Valley which runs in an unusual transverse direction to the river. Immediately below Paradox Valley it is joined by the San Miguel River, its main tributary, from the east. (Incidentally, the Dolores and San Miguel have their headwaters to either side of Lizard Head Pass.) Due to diversions on the main stem, the San Miguel is typically the same size as the Dolores if not larger, providing most of the flow below the confluence in dry years.

Below the confluence with the San Miguel, the Dolores enters Mesa County, flowing north-northwest past Gateway and then turning west into Utah.

Discharge
The United States Geological Survey has operated a stream gage at Cisco from 1950 to the present. For the 36-year period December 1950 to September 1986, the river flow at Cisco averaged . By contrast, in the 27 years from October 1986 (the year McPhee Dam was completed) to October 2013, the river averaged only  due to the McPhee Dam diversions.

Geology
The ancestral Dolores River is believed to have flowed south to join the San Juan River near the Four Corners in what is now northwestern New Mexico. The uplift of Sleeping Ute Mountain about 70 million years ago diverted the Dolores River to its present northward course, causing it to carve the Dolores River Canyon on its way to the Colorado River, creating unusual geologic features such as the Paradox Valley. The Dolores Canyon exposes rocks ranging from 300-million-year-old Pennsylvanian limestone to the 140-million-year-old Entrada sandstone deposited during the Jurassic. A cap of Cretaceous Dakota sandstone forms most of the upper rim of the canyon.

The lower Dolores River may have once been the original course of the Colorado River, which flowed through the now dry Unaweep Canyon, currently occupied by West Creek, a small tributary of the Dolores. When the Uncompahgre Plateau was formed, it diverted the larger Colorado northwards through what is now the Grand Valley, looping around through Westwater Canyon to the confluence with the Dolores in eastern Utah and leaving Unaweep Canyon as a huge dry gap across the plateau. However, some geologists contend that Colorado never flowed through Unaweep and the lower Dolores River, as the erosive force of the river should have created a water gap here; instead, the canyon may have been formed by glaciation during the Paleozoic.

River modifications

The dam and diversion canals are operated by the Bureau of Reclamation as the Dolores Project. In some years, almost all the water entering the reservoir is diverted, leaving only a small legally mandated minimum flow to pass downstream, as a result reducing the 150 mile (242 km) stretch between the dam and the confluence of the San Miguel River to a large creek.

The dam's construction allowed local farmers to extend the irrigation season through September, whereas natural river flows would have been insufficient by July or August.

Releases from McPhee Dam are a controversial topic. Currently, the Bureau of Reclamation operates McPhee on a "fill, then spill" policy, where the dam is filled first, and only in high water years when inflows exceed the reservoir capacity are larger flows released. This fact aggrieves recreational boaters, who claim it is difficult for anyone but a local resident closely watching the gauges to plan trips in advance on the river. The San Juan Citizens' Alliance has worked to start a dialogue between Dolores River stakeholders in the hopes of shifting release policy to one that allows for greater, planned releases.

Recreation
The Dolores is navigable by rafts and kayaks (up to class IV) from McPhee Reservoir to its confluence with Colorado. When water is restricted from the reservoir, it may be possible to boat downstream from the San Miguel River. However, the river is extensively used for irrigation and, during low water, years can be wholly unnavigable.

In high-runoff years, the section from Bradfield Ranch near Cahone, Colorado down to Slickrock, Colorado, offers scenery, camping, and rapids for inflatables and kayaks. The section from Slickrock to Bedrock, Colorado goes through the goosenecks of a sandstone canyon with several mostly class II rapids. The BLM does not require permits for groups running the river in Colorado, though permits are required from the Moab BLM office for boaters wishing to make the run from Gateway, CO, into Utah and to the confluence with the Colorado River near Dewey Bridge. In 2010, flash flooding altered Diversion Dam Rapid and Stateline Rapid on this section, making the latter very difficult to run in any vessel larger than a kayak.

See also
List of rivers of Colorado
List of rivers of Utah
List of tributaries of the Colorado River
Dolores River Bridge
Dolores Water Conservancy District
Current Dam Releases Below McPhee Reservoir
BLM Dolores Info
BLM's Other Dolores Info Page
San Juan Citizens' Alliance Dolores River Page
Dolores River Boating Advocates

References

External links

Rivers of Colorado
Rivers of Utah
Tributaries of the Colorado River in Colorado
Tributaries of the Colorado River in Utah
Rivers of Grand County, Utah
Rivers of Montezuma County, Colorado
Rivers of Montrose County, Colorado
Colorado Plateau
San Juan Mountains (Colorado)
Rivers of San Miguel County, Colorado
Rivers of Dolores County, Colorado
Rivers of Mesa County, Colorado